Baghdada is a town of Mardan District in the Khyber-Pakhtunkhwa, Pakistan.

Geography 
Baghdada is located at 34°13'0N 72°2'0E with an altitude of 288 metres (948 feet) and lies close to the Islamabad-Peshawar motorway. The Kalpani river flows at the eastern side of town.

See also
 List of mosques in Pakistan
 F.G. Public High School Mardan

References

External links 

 Government Post Graduate College for Women Mardan

Populated places in Mardan District